The Judo at the 1983 Southeast Asian Games was held between 30 May to 3 June at Nanyang Technological Institute.

Medal summary

Men

Women

Medal table

References
 https://eresources.nlb.gov.sg/newspapers/Digitised/Article/straitstimes19830531-1.2.123
 https://eresources.nlb.gov.sg/newspapers/Digitised/Article/straitstimes19830601-1.2.137
 https://eresources.nlb.gov.sg/newspapers/Digitised/Article/straitstimes19830602-1.2.102
 https://eresources.nlb.gov.sg/newspapers/Digitised/Article/straitstimes19830603-1.2.129
 https://eresources.nlb.gov.sg/newspapers/Digitised/Article/straitstimes19830604-1.2.113

1983 Southeast Asian Games events
1983
Asian Games, Southeast
1983 Asian Games, Southeast